The 1895–96 season was the second in the history of the Southern League. Luton Town applied for election to the Football League. However, the election was not successful. 
Millwall Athletic won Division One for the second successive season.

Division One

Division One featured one new club, who had been promoted from Division Two the previous season: New Brompton.

Division Two

Division Two featured four new clubs, all of which were newly elected:
 1st Scots Guards
 Guildford
 Windsor & Eton 
 Wolverton LNWR

Promotion-relegation test matches
At the end of the season, test matches were held between the bottom three clubs in Division One and the top three clubs in Division Two. Wolverton LNWR and Sheppey United were promoted after the play-offs, whilst Clapton remained in Division One. Although they later resigned from the league, 1st Scot Guards (who they had beaten in the play-offs) were not promoted in their place, and instead Royal Ordnance Factories kept their place in Division One.

Football League elections
Luton Town applied for election to Division Two of the Football League. However, in the election they were unsuccessful.

References

External links
Southern League First Division Tables at RSSSF
Southern League Second Division Tables at RSSSF

1895-96
1895–96 in English association football leagues